DXRZ (900 AM) RMN Zamboanga is a radio station owned and operated by the Radio Mindanao Network. The station's studio and transmitter are located at the Zamaveco Bldg., Pilar St., Zamboanga City.

Prior to the station's acquisition by RMN in 1992, DXRZ was originally owned by UM Broadcasting Network. It was known as Radyo Agong in the 90s and 2000s.

References

Radio stations established in 1961
News and talk radio stations in the Philippines
Radio stations in Zamboanga City